The theme of environmentalism in The Lord of the Rings has been remarked upon by critics since the 1970s. The Hobbits' visions of Saruman's industrial hell of Isengard and Sauron's desolate polluted land of Mordor have been interpreted as comments on modern society, while the destruction of Isengard by the tree-giant Ents, and "The Scouring of the Shire" by the Hobbits, have a strong theme of restoration of the natural environment after such industrial pollution and degradation. However, Tolkien's love of trees and unspoilt nature is apparent throughout the novel.

Context 

J. R. R. Tolkien was brought up as a boy first in rural Warwickshire at Sarehole, at that time just outside Birmingham, and then inside that industrial city. An art exhibition entitled "The Making of Mordor" at the Wolverhampton Art Gallery (2014) claimed that the steelworks and blast furnaces of the West Midlands near Tolkien's childhood home inspired his vision of Mordor, and the name that he gave it, meaning "Black Land" in his invented Elvish language of Sindarin.  This industrialized area has long been known as "the Black Country". Philip Womack, writing in The Independent, likened Tolkien's move from rural Warwickshire to urban Birmingham as "exile from a rural idyll to Mordor-like forges and fires", The critic Chris Baratta notes the contrasting environments of the well-tended leafy Shire, the home of the Hobbits, and "the industrial wastelands of Isengard and Mordor." Baratta comments that Tolkien clearly intended the reader to "identify with some of the problems of environmental destruction, rampant industrial invasion, and the corrupting and damaging effects these have on mankind." Tolkien was acutely sensitive to encroachments on the English countryside; during the Second World War, he was, like W. G. Hoskins, horrified by how much land was taken up by aerodromes. Later in life, Tolkien became obsessed with the growing threat to the countryside as cities grew and roads cut across fields and woods.

Pristine creation

Wild nature 

Tolkien makes use of wild nature in the form of forests across Middle-earth, from the Trollshaws and Mirkwood in The Hobbit, reappearing in The Lord of the Rings, to the Old Forest, Lothlórien, and Fangorn forest which each occupy whole chapters of The Lord of the Rings, not to mention the great forests of Beleriand and Valinor of The Silmarillion. Indeed, while Middle-earth was still "in a twilight under the stars", the "oldest living things had arisen: ... on earth, the shadows of great trees". For the Tolkien critic Tom Shippey, the mention of Mirkwood is an echo of the Norse mythology of the Elder Edda, with the pathless forests of the North over the Misty Mountains described in one of the poems in the Edda, the Skirnismal. 
Tolkien believed that the primeval human understanding was, as he wrote in Tree and Leaf, "communion with other living things", now lost. The Tolkien critic Paul Kocher stated that Middle-earth was meant to be the Earth itself in the distant past, when the primeval forests still existed, and with them, a wholeness that is also now lost.

Harmony with the land 
The free peoples of the West of Middle-earth, including the Hobbits of the Shire, live in definite harmony with their land; Lucas Niiler describes the whole area as "a largely pastoral setting with an agriculturally-based economy", and the Hobbits as "caring farmers, green-thumbs; beer-barley, rich tobacco and beautiful flowers spring up out of their fields and gardens with just the gentle prod of a hoe."

Environmental devastation 

In the foreword to the Second Edition of The Lord of the Rings, Tolkien wrote that while the work had no "allegorical significance ... whatsoever", it did have a basis in his personal experience. He stated that "The country in which I lived in childhood was being shabbily destroyed before I was ten", as Birmingham grew and spread houses, roads and suburban railways across the Warwickshire countryside, and he lamented "the last decrepitude of the once-thriving corn-mill beside its pool that long ago seemed to me so important".

Tolkien describes the shattering impact of industrialisation at Saruman's Isengard and in Sauron's dead land of Mordor. Tolkien's feelings about nature fit into a more general pattern of decline, the belief that while evil may be countered, the losses will not quite be made up. As Kocher writes "Ents may still be there in our forests, but what forests have we left? The process of extermination is already well under way in the Third Age, and in works outside the epic Tolkien bitterly deplores its climax today."

Saruman's Isengard 

Tolkien has the Treebeard, leader of the tree-giants, the Ents, say of the Wizard Saruman: 

Saruman's Isengard is industrial in several ways: it produces weapons and machinery made of iron, smelted and forged using trees as fuel; an unusually large and powerful breed of Orcs, able as Treebeard says to fight in daylight, produced rapidly, apparently by some kind of cloning; and a gunpowder-like explosive. The underground factories, and the contrast with how the area was before Saruman's day, are described by the narrator in "The Road to Isengard":

 

Saruman thus stands for the exact opposite of the sympathetic stewardship of Middle-earth shown by the Hobbits of the Shire and by Treebeard of Fangorn forest.

Industrial hell 

The scholar of English literature Charles A. Huttar describes Isengard as an "industrial hell". He quotes Tolkien's description of Isengard, supplying his own emphasis on Tolkien's words: "tunneled .. circle .. dark .. deep .. graveyard of unquiet dead .. the ground trembled .. treasuries .. furnaces .. iron wheels .. endlessly .. lit from beneath .. venomous." Huttar comments: "The imagery is familiar, its connotations plain. This is yet another hell [after Moria and Mordor]."

Dickerson writes that Saruman's "evil ways" are revealed exactly by his "wanton destruction" of Fangorn's trees, and notes that Treebeard calls Saruman an "accursed tree-slayer". Kocher notes that Treebeard says that Ents have a far closer sympathy for trees than shepherds do for their sheep, because "Ents are 'good at getting inside other things'". He also cites Treebeard's statement that he is "not altogether on anybody's side, because nobody is altogether on my side ... nobody cares for the woods as I care for them", but notes that all the same, Treebeard is driven by the knowledge that Saruman has taken sides in the War of the Ring to take action against him. Treebeard's Ents destroy Saruman's industrial Isengard, whose factories Saruman was fuelling by cutting down Treebeard's trees. After the destruction of the One Ring, Aragorn gives wide lands for new forest; but, Kocher writes, Tolkien gives "ominous hints that the wild wood will not prosper in the expanding Age of Man" that will follow.

A longed-for restoration

Trees marching to war 

 

In The Lord of the Rings, on the morning after the long night of the Battle of Helm's Deep, in which Saruman tried to destroy Rohan, both armies saw that a forest of angry, tree-like Huorns now filled the valley, trapping Saruman's army of Orcs. The Orcs fled into the Huorn forest and were destroyed. 

Tolkien noted in a letter that he had created walking tree-creatures [Ents and Huorns] partly in response to his "bitter disappointment and disgust from schooldays with the shabby use made in Shakespeare's Macbeth of the coming of 'Great Birnam Wood to high Dunsinane Hill': I longed to devise a setting in which the trees might really march to war". Critics note that it is a shock that the battle, the Orcs, and Saruman's hopes of conquest should end this way. They also observe that it represented Tolkien's wish-fulfilment to reverse the harm he could see being done to the English countryside.

The Scouring of the Shire 

Critics since the 1970s have commented on Tolkien's environmentalism as seen in The Lord of the Rings, especially in the chapter "The Scouring of the Shire". One of the first to note this was Paul H. Kocher, who wrote "Tolkien was an ecologist, champion of the extraordinary, hater of 'progress', lover of handicrafts, detester of war long before such attitudes became fashionable." 
Nicholas Birns calls the chapter "as much conservationist as it is traditionalist", writing that it presents a strong pro-environmentalist argument in addition to its other themes. Plank describes the chapter's emphasis on the "deterioration of the environment" "quite unusual for its time", with the Hobbits returning to the England-like Shire finding needless destruction of the old and beautiful, and its replacement by the new and ugly; pollution of air and water; neglect; "and above all, trees wantonly destroyed". The chapter has been seen as something of a call to arms, a wish to rouse people to environmental action in their "own backyard".

References

Primary 
This list identifies each item's location in Tolkien's writings.

Secondary

Sources 

 
 
 
  
 
 
 
 
 
 
 
 
 
 
 
 
 
 
 
 
 
 

Environmentalism
Themes of The Lord of the Rings
Environmental fiction books